The Fahey–Murray ministry (1992–1993) or Second Fahey–Murray ministry or Second Fahey ministry was the 83rd ministry of the New South Wales Government, and was led by the 38th Premier of New South Wales, John Fahey, representing the Liberal Party in coalition with the National Party, led by Wal Murray.

The ministry covers the period from 3 July 1992 until 26 May 1993, when Murray resigned from the ministry.

Composition of ministry

Ten ministers retained some or all of their portfolios from the first Fahey ministry. There were a series of minor reconfigurations of the ministry between August and October 1992, when Ted Pickering resigned from the police portfolio, accused of misleading parliament and the breakdown of his working relationship with Tony Lauer, the Commissioner of the New South Wales Police, with Pickering and Terry Griffiths swapping portfolios. Pickering resigned from the ministry in October 1992.

The ministry lasted until 26 May 1993, when Murray resigned from the ministry and as the Leader of the New South Wales National Party. Ian Armstrong was elected as the Nationals' Leader, resulting in the formation of the First Fahey–Armstrong ministry.

 
Ministers are members of the Legislative Assembly unless otherwise noted.

See also

 Members of the New South Wales Legislative Assembly, 1991–1995
 Members of the New South Wales Legislative Council, 1991–1995

Notes

References

 

! colspan="3" style="border-top: 5px solid #cccccc" | New South Wales government ministries

New South Wales ministries
1992 establishments in Australia
1993 disestablishments in Australia